Joseph Cruess Callaghan was an Irish flying ace.

Joseph Callaghan may also refer to:

Joseph Ayden Callaghan, an English actor
Joseph Callaghan, namesake of J. Pius Callaghan Cup
Joe Callaghan, a New Zealand footballer

See also
Joseph Callahan (disambiguation)